The Dutch Graveyard is a Dutch mausoleum at St. Paul's Hill, Malacca City, Malaysia.

The graveyard was first used during the last quarter of the 17th century during Dutch-ruled Malacca. It was used in two stages, the first being 1670–1682 and the latter being 1818–1838.

The graveyard features 5 Dutch officers and 33 British officers and their spouses.

See also
 List of tourist attractions in Malacca

References

External links

 

Buildings and structures in Malacca City
Cemeteries in Malacca
Tourist attractions in Malacca